Latvade is a village, located 3 km  from Peth Vadgaon. Taluka is Hatkanangale in Kolhapur district in the Indian state of Maharashtra.

Demographics
According to provisional results of 2011 census, the population of Latvade is 5,555, with 2,867 males and 2,688 females. There are 1,081 households.

Temples
Narsinha temple is a very old temple. The biggest celebratory function is on Narsinha Jayanti. Lotleshwar temple is another local temple. This temple is a very old construction.

References

Villages in Kolhapur district